EastEnders: E20 is a British teen drama Internet soap opera, available on BBC Online, the official website of the BBC. The series is a spin-off from the long-running soap opera EastEnders and was created by Diederick Santer. It is set in Walford, a fictional borough of London, and follows the stories of teenagers who arrive in an attempt to escape from various problems. To date, there are three series available. The first episode of the first series was made available on 8 January 2010 and the first series ran for 12 episodes until 25 January. Each episode is between 3 and 16 minutes in length. The second series was made available from September 2010 and contains 10 episodes of 14 minutes each, following complaints from fans that some episodes in series one were too short. The third series, consisting 15 episodes of around 10 minutes long, was originally available from 21 September until 21 October 2011. All three series are still available on the BBC website.

The first series follows the characters of Zsa Zsa Carter (Emer Kenny), Fatboy (Ricky Norwood), Mercy Olubunmi (Bunmi Mojekwu) and Leon Small (Sam Attwater), who meet in the first episode and decide to squat together in a flat at 89b George Street. The second follows Asher Levi (Heshima Thompson) and his brother Sol (Tosin Cole), Naz Mehmet (Emaa Hussen) and Stevie Dickinson (Amanda Fairbank-Hynes), who move into the flat above the beauty salon at 10 Turpin Road. The series 1 characters all make appearance in series 2, and Fatboy is a recurring character. The third series follows Donnie Lester (Samuell Benta), Ava Bourne (Sophie Colquhoun) and Mercy's sister Faith Olubunmi (Modupe Adeyeye), as well as brief appearances by Sol and Naz, and recurring appearances by Fatboy. Additionally, many EastEnders characters make cameo appearances throughout the three series.

Three omnibus editions of series one were available on BBC Red Button and BBC iPlayer for one week each in January 2010, and the episodes were edited into three 30-minute episodes for BBC Three, broadcast in April and May 2010. Five omnibus editions of series two were shown on BBC Three, and this continued for series 3. The first two series were written by a team of thirteen writers from London aged between 17 and 22 who responded to a writing competition and attended a summer school in August 2009 as part of the BBC's new talent initiative, where they created the entire first series. Different writers were brought in for series 3, including EastEnders actors Himesh Patel, Charlie G. Hawkins and Arinze Kene. John Yorke, along with Santer for series one, Bryan Kirkwood from series two and Sarah Miller from series 3, executively produces the series, and Deborah Sathe is producer. Michael Keillor directed the first two series, and John Howlett the third.

Series overview

Series 1
All episodes in series 1 were directed by Michael Keillor.

Series 2
All episodes in series 2 were directed by Michael Keillor.

Series 3
All episodes in series 3 were directed by John Howlett.

References

Episodes
EastEnders episodes
EastEnders lists
Lists of British teen drama television series episodes
Lists of soap opera episodes